6029 is a four-cylinder, simple, non-condensing, superheated, articulated 4-8-4+4-8-4 Garratt steam locomotive, of the AD60 class, built by Beyer, Peacock and Company, Manchester, England, for the New South Wales Government Railways (NSWGR). It was restored to operational condition in 2014, and was named City of Canberra between 2014 and late 2017.

Service
6029 entered service in 1954 on the Main North line also working on the Main South and later Main Western line. On 17 February 1959 the locomotive was converted to dual control and had an extension to the coal bunker, increasing its coal capacity.

It was withdrawn in September 1972 and condemned on 4 January 1973. In 1974, the National Museum of Australia acquired the locomotive and placed it in the custody of the Australian Railway Historical Society's Canberra Railway Museum. It worked from Sydney to Goulburn in December 1974 before hauling a special charter to Canberra on 5 January 1975.

It was restored to operational condition and operated heritage trains for the Canberra Railway Museum. 6029 became the only locomotive of its class to operate interstate when it visited Victoria in 1980, participating in a parallel run to Wangaratta with Victorian Railways locomotive K153. Heritage tours continued over several years until boiler problems caused the locomotive to be withdrawn from service in 1981.

In 1994, a feasibility study determined what was needed to get 6029 back in steam. A replacement ex-NSWGR boiler was obtained from a Victorian sawmill. Restoration commenced in 2007, being completed in July 2014. After mainline trials, 6029 received official mainline accreditation in December 2014, with the first public trips taking place on 28 February 2015.

On 23 February 2015, the locomotive was named City of Canberra by Shane Rattenbury, the Speaker of the ACT Legislative Assembly. In 2017, it was put up for sale by the liquidator of the Canberra Railway Museum when the museum went into liquidation and was purchased by Phillip Davis and David Sommerville. Due to the locomotive no longer being based in Canberra, its City of Canberra nameplates were unofficially removed in late 2017, and given to two unnamed people. This was due to the locomotive no longer based in Canberra and for historic reasons as the AD60s were barred from travelling though single line tunnels during their service, of which three exist between Bungendore and Queanbeyan on the Bombala railway line.

On 7 May 2022, Transport Heritage NSW announced that 6029 had been secured by the NSW Government to form part of the Transport Heritage NSW fleet.

Importance
6029 is the only preserved AD60 in operating condition. It is also the only "Super-Garratt" in preservation, thanks to modifications made during the locomotive's service life. However, the second throttle handle has not been connected to the main throttle since its restoration and the unnecessary second brake stand has been removed, which increases space in the cab of the loco.

Gallery

References

External links

Beyer, Peacock locomotives
Garratt locomotives
6029
Preserved steam locomotives of New South Wales
Standard gauge locomotives of Australia